Val Verde is a town in Milam County, Texas. The town was established in 1868 and was named after the Civil War Battle of Valverde.

References

Towns in Milam County, Texas